Seomyeon (Hangeul: 서면  Hanja: 西面 lit. "West face/front")  is the commercial center and transportation hub  in Busanjin-gu, Busan, South Korea.  Seomyeon is also the most crowded area in Busan, having an average floating population of 1,000,000 a day.

Name  
The area called Seomyeon is  Bujeon-dong, Busanjin-gu, Busan.  The name of  Seomyeon was that of an old administrative district surrounding the area when Busan was  a small village in the Joseon Dynasty Era. In modern times, Busan residents still call the area Seomyeon even though its official administrative name now is Bujeon-dong.

Symbology 

The district flag of Busanjin-gu symbolizes the 5-way intersection of Seomyeon. It represents the center of Busan as a hub of globalization, finance, commerce, distribution, and information. The district tree is the gingko, which can be seen throughout the area and is said to symbolize stability due to the resistant nature that protects it against disease and insects. The district flower is the chrysanthemum, another plant known to endure harsh conditions. The district bird is the magpie, known for building nests in the branches of very high trees.

Transportation  

Seomyeon is a transportation hub for public transportation  in Busan.   Seomyeon Station is near the Seomyeon road junction and is one of the busiest subway stations in Korea; it is the transfer station between Busan Subway Line 1 and Line 2.  Bujeon Station near Bujeon Market is a train station on the Donghae Nambu Line and Bujeon Line.

A bus transfer center also lies in front of the Busan main store of the Lotte Department Store.

References 

Busanjin District
Shopping districts and streets in South Korea